Iacopo Bortolas (born 7 June 2003) is an Italian nordic combined skier who represented Italy at the 2022 Winter Olympics.

References

External links

Living people
2003 births
Italian male Nordic combined skiers
Sportspeople from Trentino
Nordic combined skiers at the 2020 Winter Youth Olympics
Nordic combined skiers at the 2022 Winter Olympics
Olympic Nordic combined skiers of Italy
21st-century Italian people